The 2020 Valparaiso University football team represented Valparaiso University in the 2020–21 NCAA Division I FCS football season. They were led by second-year head coach Landon Fox and played their home games at Brown Field. They competed in the Pioneer Football League.

Previous season

In their final season under the "Crusaders" name, Valparaiso finished the 2019 season 1–11, 1–7 to finish in a two-way tie for last place.

Schedule
Valparaiso's games scheduled against North Dakota and Central Connecticut were canceled on July 27 due to the Pioneer Football League's decision to play a conference-only schedule due to the COVID-19 pandemic.

References

Valparaiso University
Valparaiso Beacons football seasons
Valparaiso University football